Sankt Kilian is a village and a former municipality in the district of Hildburghausen, in Thuringia, Germany. Since July 2018, it is part of the town of Schleusingen.

References

Hildburghausen (district)
Former municipalities in Thuringia